The Fungiidae are a family of Cnidaria, commonly known as mushroom corals or plate corals. The family contains thirteen extant genera. They range from solitary corals to colonial species. Some genera such as Cycloseris and Fungia are solitary organisms, Polyphyllia consists of a single organism with multiple mouths, and Ctenactis and Herpolitha might be considered as solitary organisms with multiple mouths or a colony of individuals, each with its separate mouth.

Characteristics
Species are generally solitary marine animals capable of benthic locomotion. These corals often appear to be bleached or dead. In most genera, a single polyp emerges from the center of the skeleton to feed at night. Most species remain fully detached from the substrate in adulthood. Some are immobile as well as colonial.

Ecology
Some species of mushroom coral such as Fungia repanda and Ctenactis echinata are able to change sex. This is posited to take place in response to environmental or energetic constraints, and to improve the organism's evolutionary fitness; similar phenomena are observed in some dioecious plants.

Genera
The World Register of Marine Species includes these genera in the family:
Cantharellus Hoeksema & Best, 1984
Ctenactis Verrill, 1864
Cycloseris Milne Edwards & Haime, 1849
Danafungia Wells, 1966
Fungia Lamarck, 1801
Halomitra Dana, 1846
Heliofungia Wells, 1966
Herpolitha Eschscholtz, 1825
Lithophyllon Rehberg, 1892
Lobactis Verrill, 1864
Pleuractis Verrill, 1864
Podabacia Milne Edwards & Haime, 1849
Polyphyllia Blainville, 1830
Sandalolitha Quelch, 1884
Sinuorota Oku, Naruse & Fukami, 2017
Zoopilus Dana, 1846

Notable species
One fungiid species, Heliofungia actiniformis ("anemone coral"), can be easily mistaken for a sea anemone [actiniarian] because its tentacles remain visible during the day.
Fungia spp. have a commensal pipefish, Siokunichthys nigrolineatus.
Heliofungia actiniformis provides shelter to some fish species (Gobiidae and Labridae).
Some fungiids can be elongated and look like a sea cucumber (stichopodid).
Some fungiids (Danafungia scruposa) have been observed eating jellyfish.

Importance to humans
Members of the family Fungiidae are not of any commercial importance, but are collected for the aquarium trade and are sold as "plate corals".

See also
Coral fungus
Mussidae

References

Gallery

External links

AIMS CoralSearch - Heliofungia actiniformis
Stony Corals Image Gallery
Fungia scruposa eating a jelly fish (news.bbc.co.uk)

 
Scleractinia
Cnidarian families
Taxa named by James Dwight Dana